Stupp–Oxenrider Farm is a historic farm complex and national historic district located in North Heidelberg Township, Berks County, Pennsylvania.  It has nine contributing buildings, one contributing site, and four contributing structures.  They include a -story, log Swiss bank house (c. 1784); 2-story, log, tenant / grandfather's house (c. 1790); and frame Pennsylvania bank barn (c. 1850).  The remaining buildings include a stone summer kitchen / butcher house, smokehouse, blacksmith's shop, wagon shed, milk house, and privy. The contributing structures are a chicken house, brooder house, pole shed, and roofed spring.  The contributing site is a limestone quarry.

The original owners of the farm were ethnic German Swiss Mennonites. It was listed on the National Register of Historic Places in 1992.

References

Farms on the National Register of Historic Places in Pennsylvania
German-American culture in Pennsylvania
Historic districts on the National Register of Historic Places in Pennsylvania
Houses completed in 1784
Houses in Berks County, Pennsylvania
Mennonitism in Pennsylvania
Swiss-American culture in Pennsylvania
National Register of Historic Places in Berks County, Pennsylvania